This is a list of courts in the District of Columbia, in the United States.

Local courts 
 District of Columbia Court of Appeals
 Superior Court of the District of Columbia

Federal courts 
 Supreme Court of the United States
 United States Court of Appeals for the District of Columbia Circuit
 United States District Court for the District of Columbia
 United States Tax Court
 United States Court of Appeals for the Federal Circuit
 United States Court of Appeals for Veterans Claims
 United States Court of Federal Claims
 United States Court of Appeals for the Armed Forces
 United States Foreign Intelligence Surveillance Court of Review
 United States Foreign Intelligence Surveillance Court

Former federal courts 
 United States District Court for the District of Potomac (1801–1802; also contained pieces of Maryland and Virginia; extinct, reorganized)

References 

Government of the District of Columbia
Courts in the United States